Ribose-5-phosphate isomerase deficiency  is a human disorder caused by mutations in ribose-5-phosphate isomerase, an enzyme of the pentose phosphate pathway. With only four diagnosed patients over a 27-year period, RPI deficiency is the second rarest disease known as of now, being beaten only by Fields Condition affecting three individuals, Catherine and Kirstie Fields, and one unknown person.

Mechanism 
In the search for an explanation for this rarity, it has been found that the patient has a seldom-seen allelic combination. One allele is a nonfunctional null allele, while the other encodes for a partially active enzyme. Furthermore, the partially functional allele has expression deficits that depend on the cell type in which it is expressed. Therefore, some of the patient's cells have a considerable amount of RPI activity, whereas others do not.

The molecular cause of the pathology is not fully understood. One hypothesis is that ribose-5-phosphate may be insufficient for RNA synthesis. Another possibility is that the accumulation of D-ribitol and D-arabitol may be toxic.

Diagnosis
Symptoms include optic atrophy, nystagmus, cerebellar ataxia, seizures, spasticity, psychomotor retardation, leukoencephalopathy and global developmental delay.

Treatment
There is no current treatment or prognosis for ribose-5-phosphate isomerase deficiency.

History 
The first patient was a male born in 1984 to healthy, unrelated parents. Early in life, the patient had psychomotor retardation and developed epilepsy at age 4. From age 7, a slow neurological regression occurred with prominent cerebellar ataxis, some spasticity, optic atrophy, and a mild sensorimotor neuropathy with no observed organomegaly dysfunction of internal organs. MRI scans at age 11 and 14 revealed extensive abnormalities of the cerebral white matter and elevated levels of D-ribitol and D-arabitol.

In 1999 van der Knaap and colleagues reviewed this case of the then 14-year-old boy and characterised the associated symptoms of RPI deficiency as the following: developmental delay, insidious psychomotor regression, epilepsy, leukoencephalopathy and abnormal polyol metabolism. Later, Naik and colleagues reported a second case, an 18-year-old man with seizures, psychomotor regression and diffuse white matter abnormality. A third case was reported in 2018 by Sklower Brooks and colleagues, a child with neonatal onset leukoencephalopathy and psychomotor delays. A fourth case was reported in 2019 by Kaur and colleagues with progressive leukoencephalopathy and elevated urine polyols arabitol and ribitol.

References

External links 

Rare diseases